Le Courrier du Sud is a free French-language weekly tabloid newspaper based in Longueuil, Quebec, Canada. The newspaper is distributed to 143,992 homes in the cities of Longueuil (boroughs of Le Vieux-Longueuil, Saint-Hubert and Greenfield Park), Brossard and Saint-Lambert. 'Le Courrier du Sud is owned by Transcontinental. It was established in 1947 by Jean-Paul Auclair in the former city of Montreal South as a bilingual newspaper (and was also known at the time as The South Courier).

References

External links
 Le Courrier du Sud (official website)

French-language newspapers published in Quebec
Mass media in Longueuil
Publications established in 1947
Quebecor
Bilingual newspapers
Weekly newspapers published in Quebec
Mass media in Montérégie
1947 establishments in Quebec
1947 establishments in Canada